Edenbridge are a symphonic metal band from Austria, led by songwriter Arne "Lanvall" Stockhammer and fronted by soprano singer Sabine Edelsbacher. Established in 1998, the band has so far released ten studio albums.

History

1998-2004
Edenbridge was formed in 1998 by guitarist and keyboardist Lanvall, singer Sabine Edelsbacher, and bassist Kurt Bednarsky. The line-up was completed when drummer Roland Navratil joined the band. Edenbridge entered the recording studio in 1999, signing a record deal with Massacre Records the same year. In the following year, their debut album Sunrise in Eden was released.

The band added a second guitarist, Georg Edelmann, to its line-up in February 2000, but his stay with the band was to be a short one. When he left in January 2001, he was replaced by Andreas Eiblar. Under this line-up, Edenbridge released the album Arcana (2001). During a tour in 2002, Edenbridge's bassist and founding member Kurt Bednarsky left the band. In December 2003, the album Aphelion was released.

Their next album, recorded live and entitled A Livetime In Eden, was released in August 2004, followed by the studio album Shine in October. At that time, a new bassist, Frank Bindig, joined the band. In December the same year, guitarist Andreas Eibler left the band and was replaced by Martin Mayr.

Napalm Records, more personnel changes

The Grand Design (2006), their fifth studio album, was recorded at Lanvall's studio Farpoint Station and was released on 19 May 2006 in Europe, and on 30 January 2007 in America. The single "For Your Eyes Only" was released on 21 April 2006 featuring the album track "Evermore" and a cover version of the James Bond theme of "For Your Eyes Only", the first cover the band ever recorded. The following year, Edenbridge signed a worldwide deal with Napalm Records.

Edenbridge released MyEarthDream in April 2008. The album features the Czech Film Orchestra, with arrangements by Enrique Ugarte. In November 2008 bass player Frank Bindig left, and he was replaced the next year by Simon Holzknecht; Dominik Sebastian joined on guitar. A few days later, on 4 May 2009, Edenbridge released LiveEarthDream, a limited-edition live album recorded in 2008.

Solitaire was released on 2 July 2010 and charted at #95 in Germany. In February 2010, bassist Simon Holzknecht left the band.

In 2012, the band asked fans to help sponsor the new album's orchestra recordings. In late 2012, all orchestra and drum recordings had been completed. Bassist Wolfgang Rothbauer who formerly played for Disbelief and Zombie Inc. joined Edenbridge in 2013. The eighth studio album The Bonding was released in June 2013.

Lanvall and Sabine began a side project, "Voiciano", in February 2014. It focuses exclusively on acoustical music and released their first album, Everflow, in 2014.

In November 2014 the band announced their first video album, called A Decade and a Half... The History So Far to celebrate their 15th anniversary. The video album contains early beginnings of the band, tour and studio documentaries and live concerts from 1998 to 2014. The album was released on 8 May 2015.

The ninth studio album, The Great Momentum, was released on 17 February 2017. It reached position 80 in the Swiss album charts and 82 in Germany.

On August 26, 2022, they released their eleventh studio album titled Shangri-La. The album is the band's first album under AFM records.

Band members

Current members
 Sabine Edelsbacher – vocals (1998–present)
 Arne "Lanvall" Stockhammer – 7 & 6 string guitars, keyboards, instruments, orchestration (1998–present)
 Dominik Sebastian –  guitar (2008–present)
 Johannes Jungreithmeier – drums (2016–present)
 Stefan Gimpl – bass <small>(2017-present)

Touring members
 Andreas Oberhauser – bass (2002)
 Mike Koren – bass (2003)

Guest musicians
 Stefan Model – bass (2003)

Former members
 Kurt Bednarsky – bass (1998–2002)
 Roland Navratil – drums (1998–2007)
 Georg Edelmann – guitar (2000)
 Andreas Eibler – guitar (2001–2004)
 Frank Bindig – bass (2004–2008)
 Martin Mayr – guitar (2005–2006)
 Robert Schoenleitner – guitar (2006–2008)
 Sebastian Lanser – drums (2007)
 Max Pointner – drums, percussion (2007–2016)
 Simon Holzknecht – bass (2009–2010)
 Wolfgang Rothbauer – bass (2013–2016)

Timeline

Discography

Studio albums 
Sunrise in Eden (2000)
Arcana (2001)
Aphelion (2003)
Shine (2004)
The Grand Design (2006)
My Earth Dream (2008)
Solitaire (2010)
The Bonding (2013)
The Great Momentum (2017)
Dynamind (2019)
Shangri-La (2022)

Live albums 
A Livetime in Eden (2004)
LiveEarthDream (2009)
Live Momentum (2017)

Compilation albums 
The Chronicles of Eden (2007)
The Chronicles of Eden, Part 2  (2021)

Singles 
 Shine (2004)
 For Your Eyes Only (2006)
 Shiantara (2016)

Music videos
 Higher (2010)
 Alight a New Tomorrow (2013)
 The Moment Is Now (2017)
 On the Other Side (2019)
 The Road to Shangri-La (2022)
 The Call of Eden (2022)

Lyric videos
 Shiantara (2016)
 Live and Let Go (2019)
 Somewhere Else but Here (2022)

Video albums 
 A Decade and a Half... The History So Far (2015)

References

External links

Official website

1998 establishments in Austria
Austrian symphonic metal musical groups
Former Massacre Records artists
Musical groups established in 1998
Musical quintets
Progressive metal musical groups